Bhangra is a type of traditional folk dance of Punjab, originating in the Sialkot area of Punjab, Pakistan. It is done in the season of harvesting. According to Manuel (2001), bhangra is especially associated with the vernal Vaisakhi festival.

In a typical performance, several dancers execute vigorous kicks, leaps, and bends of the body—often with upraised, thrusting arm or shoulder movements—to the accompaniment of short songs called boliyan and, most significantly, to the beat of a dhol (double-headed drum). Struck with a heavy beater on one end and with a lighter stick on the other, the dhol imbues the music with a syncopated (accents on the weak beats), swinging rhythmic character that has generally remained the hallmark of bhangra music. An energetic Punjabi dance, bhangra originated with Punjab farmers as a cultural and communal celebration; its modern-day evolution has allowed bhangra to retain its traditional Punjabi roots, while broadening its reach to include integration into popular music and DJing, group-based competitions, and even exercise and dance programs in schools and studios.

During harvest season
Bhangra was mainly done by Punjabi farmers during the harvesting season. It was mainly performed while farmers did agricultural chores. As they did each farming activity they would perform bhangra moves on the spot. This allowed them to finish their job in a pleasurable way. After harvesting their wheat crops during the Vaisakhi season, people used to attend cultural festivals while dancing bhangra. For many years, farmers performed bhangra to showcase a sense of accomplishment and to welcome the new harvesting season.

Traditional bhangra folk dance of Majha 

The origins of traditional bhangra are speculative. According to Dhillon (1998), bhangra is related to the Punjabi dance 'Bagaa', which is a martial dance of Punjab. However, the folk dance of Bhangra originated in the Sialkot district of Majha. The traditional form of bhangra danced in the villages of Sialkot district was regarded as the standard. The community form of traditional bhangra has been maintained in Gurdaspur district, India, and has been maintained by people who have settled in Hoshiarpur, Punjab, India. Traditional 
bhangra is performed in a circle and is performed using traditional dance steps. Traditional bhangra is now also performed on occasions other than during the harvest season. According to Ganhar (1975), bhangra originated in Sialkot of Majha which shares high affinity with Jammu making it part of the heritage of Jammu which is danced on Baisakhi. Other Punjabi folk dances such as Giddha and Luddi have also been heritage of Jammu. Punjabi language influences can be observed when people dance such dances. Jammu falls within the Punjab region and shares an affinity with Punjab.

Free form traditional bhangra
The 1950s saw the development of the free form traditional bhangra in Punjab, which was patronized by the Maharaja of Patiala, who requested a staged performance of bhangra in 1953. The first significant developers of this style were a dance troupe led by brothers from the Deepak family of Sunam (Manohar, Avtar and Gurbachan) and the dhol player Bhana Ram Sunami.<ref name=Booth>Gregory D. Booth, Bradley Shope (2014). More Than c1RSVbOFJc607QbAoIOwCg&ved=0CC4Q6AEwAA#v=onepage&q=sunam%20bhangra&f=false]</ref> Free form traditional bhangra developed during stage performances which incorporate traditional bhangra moves and also include sequences from other Punjabi dances, namely, Luddi, Jhummar, Dhamaal, and Gham Luddi. The singing of Punjabi folk songs, boliyan, are incorporated from Malwai Giddha. Bhangra competitions have been held in Punjab, India, for many decades, with Mohindra College in Patiala being involved in the 1950s.

Bhangra today
Bhangra connects to a much deeper set of masculine values. Most of these values are set through labour, industry and self-sufficiency in agriculture, loyalty, independence and bravery in personal, political and military endeavours; and the development and expression of virility, vigour, and honour are common themes. Bhangra referred both to formal male performances and to communal dancing among men and women. In the past 30 years, bhangra has been established all over the world. It has become integrated into popular Asian culture after being mixed with hip hop, house and reggae styles of music. Certain bhangra moves have been adapted and changed over time but at its core remains a sense of cultural identity and tradition. We see bhangra take place mainly in the Punjabi culture. Many people tend to showcase bhangra as a source of joy and entertainment at weddings, parties, and all sorts of celebrations.

Many people also do bhangra as a source of exercise, it is an excellent substitution to the gym. Traditionally, bhangra is danced by men but now we see both men and women participating in this dance form. With bhangra competitions all over the world, we see all sorts of people competing in these events.

 Women in bhangra 
Nowadays, many second-generation Punjabi women who are connecting with their culture through bhangra. Many of these young girls tend to bring their bhangra moves into the club scene. D.J. Rekha was one of the first South Asian women to bring popularity to bhangra in the U.S by introducing her Basement Bhangra Parties. Many university and community clubs have started their own bhangra teams. Most of these teams have a wide variety of men and women who come from different backgrounds. Many businesses have created bhangra clubs with the mindset to teach younger kids bhangra. These programs have helped young children stay healthy and connected to the culture of bhangra. Sarina Jain was the very first woman who created the bhangra fitness workout, which is now known as the Masala Bhangra Workout. This workout has taught many people in Iceland the basic steps associated with bhangra, allowing them to learn bhangra in the comfort of their own home.

 Raaniyan Di Raunaq 
Raaniyan Di Raunaq is India's first all-women's bhangra competition. Even with the abundance of female bhangra performers, many see this dance form as only masculine. Historically, women have fought for the right to perform bhangra. Many women that compete in bhangra shows are judged according to a criterion that is made for male performers. Raaniyan Di Raunaq has customized a bhangra competition just for women or for those who identify as transgender or nonbinary. This competition has coveted a safe space for women to have the ability to compete and be judged equally.

 Gallery 

See also
Bhangra Empire
Dhol
Punjabi folk dances
Giddha
Music of Punjab

References

Further reading
Dhillon, Iqbal Singh. 1998. Folk Dances of Panjab''. Delhi: National Book Shop.
Pandher, Gurdeep. 2016. "History of Bhangra". History of Bhangra, Gurdeep Pandher.
Schreffler, Gibb. 2010. Signs of Separation: Dhol in Punjabi Culture. University of California, Santa Barbara.
Schreffler, Gibb. 2013. "Situating bhangra dance: a critical introduction". 'South Asian History and Culture' 4(3): 384–412.

External links

Punjabi culture
Folk dances of Punjab
Punjabi words and phrases
Dances of India
Dance in Pakistan
Bhangra (music)
Desi culture